Robert Desmond (16 December 1922 – 2002) was a British film and television actor of the 1950s and 1960s.

He started out in juvenile roles, making his film debut in 1948's The Guinea Pig opposite Richard Attenborough. He appeared in a number of early television films such Boys in Brown, recreating the role of Spud Parker in the theatrical film version of 1949, again with Attenborough. He would appear opposite Attenborough one more time in The Great Escape (1963), as Griffith the Tailor. Other films include The Cockleshell Heroes (1955), Indiscreet (1958), The Ugly Duckling (1959), Sink the Bismarck! (1960), The Bulldog Breed (1960) and The Best of Enemies (1961).

On television he appeared in the UK's first daily soap opera Sixpenny Corner as Stan Norton and later starred in the popular sixties soap Compact as Adrian Coombs. In 1967 he played Tod Miller in another soap opera Crossroads. In 1960 he starred as Private Billy "Noddy" Baker in the third series of popular sitcom The Army Game.

Other television appearances include The Adventures of Robin Hood, Dial 999, ITV Play of the Week and The Avengers.

Filmography

External links

2002 deaths
English male film actors
English male television actors
1922 births
Male actors from London